A gubernatorial election was held on 1 September 2002 to elect the next governor of , a prefecture of Japan located in the Chūbu region of Honshu island.

Candidates 

Yasuo Tanaka, 46, incumbent since 2000, novelist. Meanwhile he was officially not supported by any party, the SDP and JCP supported him.
Keiko Hasegawa, 50, lawyer. She was supported by the LDP, New Komeito party and the NCP.
Shu Ichikawa, 50, a board member of a Tokyo-based think tank led by Tokyo Gov. Shintaro Ishihara (LDP).
Chozo Nakagawa, 46, former company employee, graduate student at Shinshu University.
Hideyoshi Hashiba, 52, wealthy company owner.
Nobuaki Hanaoka, 56, Sankei Shimbun editorial writer. He gave up after agreeing to support Hasegawa in exchange for Hasegawa's adopting some of his campaign policies, but appear on the electoral ballot.

Reference:

Results

References 

2002 elections in Japan
Nagano gubernational elections
Politics of Nagano Prefecture